Dead Roses is an American independent zombie horror film written and directed by Robert McCorkle and produced by Jonathan Tucker, who also performs in the film. The film, which Tucker self-described as "Night of the Living Dead in the projects", was independently produced in Brooklyn, New York for $5,000.

Plot
A woman's fiancé played by Marcus Collins is killed by a drug dealing gang. For revenge, the woman conjures up a zombie to hunt down the gangmembers and kill them.

Production
Tucker and McCorkle first began working on the film shortly after meeting at an investment banking firm. The two decided to create their own low-budget film using Hi-8 and Mini DV video cameras, filming in public housing projects and performing editing on a personal computer. McCorkle also taught himself rudimentary special effects techniques for the film, stating that "Just because we're low-budget doesn't mean it can't be realistic—at least movie-realistic." Apart from being the writer, director, and make-up artist, McCorkle also served as the grip and caterer.

See also
List of zombie short films and undead-related projects

References

External links

Johnathan Tucker: From Film Actor to Film Director

2004 horror films
American gang films
American independent films
American zombie films
2004 films
2004 directorial debut films
2000s English-language films
2000s American films